Sergey Alekseyevich Veremeenko (born 26 September 1955) is a Russian businessman and politician who, according to Forbes magazine, has a net worth of 1.4 billion US Dollars. He has investments in steel, mining, banking and microchips. He has 25% of shares in Estar, a steel and metals group, and also owns luxury housing developments in Moscow’s suburbs and vast agricultural land in Tver, Kaluga and Penza. He also holds publishing interests in the newspapers Pravda.ru and Pravda International.

Sergey Veremeenko was born in Ufa. In 2003 he ran for president of the Bashkortostan Republic. During these elections he ran against the head of the region, Murtaza Rakhimov but Veremeenko eventually dropped out of the election race. The same year he ended his partnership with Sergey Pugachev, with whom he co-owned the International Industrial Bank.

Veremeenko is married and has three children. His third wife, Sofya Skya (née Arzhakovskaya), holds the title of Mrs. World 2006. They had a son Sergey, born in 2016.

He is one of the members of the State Duma the United States Treasury sanctioned on 24 March 2022 in response to the 2022 Russian invasion of Ukraine.

References

1955 births
People from Ufa
Russian businesspeople in metals
Russian billionaires
Living people
Seventh convocation members of the State Duma (Russian Federation)
Eighth convocation members of the State Duma (Russian Federation)
Russian individuals subject to the U.S. Department of the Treasury sanctions
Russian bankers